Ćelije is a village located in the municipality of Kruševac, Serbia. According to the 2011 census, the village has a population of 242 inhabitants.

References

Populated places in Rasina District